is a Japanese politician of the Democratic Party for the People and a member of the House of Representatives in the Diet (national legislature).

Career
A native of Saga, Saga and graduate of the University of Tokyo, he was elected to the assembly of Saga Prefecture (District #1) for the first time in 1987 as a member of the Liberal Democratic Party, serving there for two times.  In 1996 he was elected to the House of Representatives from Saga's 1st district for the first time as a member of the New Frontier Party (Shinshinto) after running unsuccessfully in 1993 as an independent.  He switched to the DPJ in 1998.  He was Minister of Internal Affairs from 2009 to 2010, in Yukio Hatoyama and Naoto Kan's Cabinets.

Haraguchi studied Psychology at the University of Tokyo and attended the Matsushita Institute of Government and Management.  He often appears on television in which he discusses tax, pension, and decentralization issues.

In the 2012 general election Haraguchi lost his single-seat electorate but retained a seat in the diet through the proportional representation system. He regained his seat in the 2014 election.

Positions
Haraguchi is affiliated to the openly revisionist lobby Nippon Kaigi, and a member of the association of parliamentarians promoting visits to the controversial Yasukuni shrine"

Haraguchi gave the following answers to the questionnaire submitted by Mainichi to parliamentarians in 2012:
in favor of the revision of the Constitution
in favor of right of collective self-defense (revision of Article 9)
in favor of reform of the National assembly (unicameral instead of bicameral)
in favor of zero nuclear power by 2030s
in favor of the relocation of Marine Corps Air Station Futenma (Okinawa)
in favor of the reform of the Imperial Household that would allow women to retain their Imperial status even after marriage
against participation of Japan to the Trans-Pacific Partnership
against a nuclear-armed Japan

References

External links
 Official website in Japanese.

|-

|-

|-

1959 births
Living people
Government ministers of Japan
Members of the House of Representatives (Japan)
Ministers of Internal Affairs of Japan
New Frontier Party (Japan) politicians
20th-century Japanese politicians
Members of Nippon Kaigi
Liberal Democratic Party (Japan) politicians
Democratic Party of Japan politicians
21st-century Japanese politicians